Šútovo is a village and municipality in Martin District in the Žilina Region of northern Slovakia.

History
In historical records the village was first mentioned in 1403.

Geography
The municipality lies at an altitude of 460 metres and covers an area of 16.639 km². It has a population of about 505 people.

External links

http://www.statistics.sk/mosmis/eng/run.html

Flag
 

Erb
 

Photos
 

Villages and municipalities in Martin District